Tom, Dick, and Harry, Rock Again! (also known as Tom, Dick and Harry 2) is a 2009 Bollywood comedy film directed by Rahul Kapoor and produced by Surendra Kapoor. The film is a sequel to the 2006 comedy flick Tom, Dick, and Harry. The film stars a completely new cast except for Celina Jaitley who also starred in the first movie. The new cast include Suresh Menon, Mika Singh, Aryeman Ramsay and Howard Rosemeyer in lead roles.

The song "Tere Pyar Mein", which was featured in the film, was arranged by Canadian producer Vikas Kohli of Fatlabs Studios.

Cast 
Celina Jaitley as Shilpi
Suresh Menon as Bobby "Bob" Arora
Mika Singh as Tommy (Tom)
Aryeman Ramsay as Dicklesh (Dick)
Howard Rosemeyer as Harri
Nisha Rawal as Soniaa
Simple Kaur

Soundtrack

References

External links
 

2009 films
2000s Hindi-language films
Indian comedy films
Indian sequel films
2009 comedy films
Hindi-language comedy films